Chimoré Airport is an airport serving Chimoré, a town in the Cochabamba Department of Bolivia.

The airport is beside a bend in the Chimoré River. The runway length includes a  displaced threshold on Runway 35.

The airport was constructed at a cost of US$40 million to the tax payer.

Airlines and destinations

See also
Transport in Bolivia
List of airports in Bolivia

References

External links 
OpenStreetMap - Chimoré
OurAirports - Chimoré
FallingRain - Chimoré Airport

Airports in Cochabamba Department